Harriet Florence Maling (née Mylander, October 2, 1918 – March 1987) was an American pharmacologist. She graduated Phi Beta Kappa from Goucher College in 1940. She went to Harvard Medical School to continue her studies, earning a PhD in 1944.

Her focus of study involved the physiology of the heart, the effects of various drugs upon the heart and on the autonomic and sympathetic nervous systems, experimenting with artificially created myocardial infarction.

Her daughter Joan Maling is a linguist and past president of the Linguistic Society of America.

References 

1918 births

1987 deaths
American pharmacologists
Goucher College alumni
Harvard Medical School faculty
Women pharmacologists
National Institutes of Health faculty
Harvard Medical School alumni